The 1924 United States presidential election in Iowa took place on November 4, 1924, as part of the 1924 United States presidential election which was held throughout all contemporary 48 states. Voters chose 13 representatives, or electors to the Electoral College, who voted for president and vice president. 

Iowa voted for the Republican nominee, incumbent President Calvin Coolidge of Massachusetts, over Progressive nominee, Wisconsin Senator Robert M. La Follette of and Democratic nominee, Ambassador John W. Davis of West Virginia. Coolidge ran with former Budget Director Charles G. Dawes of Illinois, while Davis ran with Governor Charles W. Bryan of Nebraska while La Follette ran with Montana Senator Burton K. Wheeler.

Iowa was the most southeasterly of 12 states where Democrat Davis ran third behind both Coolidge and La Follette. Davis’ performance is the worst by any major-party nominee since Iowa became a state in 1846, whilst La Follette’s is the second-best by any third-party candidate in Iowa presidential election history behind Theodore Roosevelt in 1912.

Results

Results by county

See also
 United States presidential elections in Iowa

Notes

References

Iowa
1924
1924 Iowa elections